Charles McMurtry (February 15, 1937 - February 13, 1984)  was an American football player.  A defensive tackle, he played professionally in the American Football League for the Buffalo Bills and Oakland Raiders.  McMurtry played college football at Whittier College. He died in February 1984

External links
NFL.com player page

References

1937 births
1984 deaths
People from Chandler, Oklahoma
Whittier Poets football players
American football defensive tackles
Buffalo Bills players
Oakland Raiders players
American Football League All-Star players
American Football League All-League players
American Football League players
Burials at Rose Hills Memorial Park